San Vito sullo lonio is a comune and town in the province of Catanzaro located in the valley in Calabria region of Italy.
The patron saint of San Vito is St. Vitus. Legend has it that St. Vitus himself protected the town from a flood. The town's economy relies 
heavily on agriculture and tourism.

References

Cities and towns in Calabria